The U.S. Woodland is a camouflage pattern that was used as the default camouflage pattern issued to the United States Armed Forces from 1981, with the issue of the Battle Dress Uniform, until its replacement in the mid to late 2000s. It is a four color, high contrast disruptive pattern with irregular markings in green, brown, sand and black. It is also known unofficially by its colloquial moniker of "M81", though this term was not officially used by the U.S. military. 

Although completely phased out of frontline use in the U.S. Armed Forces, U.S. Woodland is still used on some limited level by some branches such as MOPP suits, equipment and vests left over while some modernized uniforms (either BDU or commercial) were worn specifically by special forces such as USMC Forces Special Operations Command and United States Navy Seabees.

Development and history 
The woodland pattern is nearly identical to highland ERDL, only differing in that it is printed from an enlargement of the original. The woodland pattern was enlarged and the borders of the splotches were re-drawn to make them less regular. Part of the earlier pattern was left off the later pattern because the enlargement made them no longer fit on the width of the bolt of cloth. The pattern does not repeat horizontally across the width of the bolt, but only vertically along its length. The pattern was officially adopted in 1981.

The effect of enlarging the pattern was to make the pattern more visible at a distance, avoiding "blobbing", where smaller areas of color seem to blend into larger blobs. This also gave the pattern a higher contrast, making it stand out more sharply at close distances and defeating the camouflage effect at closer range. Digital and Flecktarn camouflage patterns resolve this problem by using a range of blob sizes to give a similar effect whatever the distance.

These changes reflected a shift in the tactical focus of the United States military from fighting an extremely close-range war such as the one in South Vietnam to a longer-range one such as on the fields of Europe.

Usage

U.S. Army 
In the U.S. Army, the woodland-patterned Battle Dress Uniform was replaced by the digital Universal Camouflage Pattern (UCP) found on the Army Combat Uniform, introduced in 2004. UCP itself was replaced by the Operational Camouflage Pattern (OCP) in 2019. The pattern is still used on MOPP suits and some older models of body armor yet to be retired, such as PASGT vests and Interceptor Body Armor.

U.S. Navy 
The U.S. Navy no longer uses the Woodland pattern. Most of the Navy has transitioned to the Navy Working Uniform, which uses digital patterns in either a woodland colorway (NWU Type III) or, for some deployed tactical units only, a desert version (Type II).

U.S. Marines 
The Woodland Pattern BDU was phased out by the Marine Corps with the introduction of the digital MARPAT Marine Corps Combat Utility Uniform in 2002, although it was reintroduced for the United States Marine Corps Forces Special Operations Command in 2011 and was also worn by MARSOC forces in the War in Afghanistan.

U.S. Air Force 
The Air Force phased out the woodland pattern battle dress uniform in 2011 when they went to the Airman Battle Uniform (ABU) which used a pixelated version of the Tigerstripe pattern. It was in turn replaced by the Army's OCP by 2021. The Civil Air Patrol, the U.S. Air Force's civilian auxiliary, also used woodland patterned BDUs until being discontinued 15 June 2021.

State defense forces 
Several state defense forces use the Woodland Pattern on their BDUs. Members of the Virginia Defense Force wear a Woodland version of the Army Combat Uniform (ACU). The pattern also sees use among police departments, such as the Rhode Island State Police.

Users 

: Adopted an Armenian-made Woodland pattern.
: Obtained Turkish-made Woodland uniforms and used from around 2000-12.
: Used by OPFOR during the 1990s and 2000s
: Used Woodland uniforms with bright yellow patterns.

: Used by the RS' Special Anti-Terrorist Unit.
: Used Cambodian-made Woodland uniforms.

: Formerly used by the Canadian Forces as the pattern of helmet covers for the M1 Helmet (both regular and paratrooper variants), the PASGT Helmet and the Spectra Helmet otherwise known as the 'Barrday Helmet'. The Woodland pattern had originally entered service around the same time as the US and had become the standard issue cover by the late 1980s, replacing the older Mitchell Pattern covers. The cover pattern was fully phased out and replaced by CADPAT by the mid 2000s. Helmet covers as well as uniforms (like former US BDUs) and webbing equipment are still seen in Woodland pattern for OPFOR training.

: Used by Cypriot special forces.

: Woodland camo used by some Fijian military units.

: Former standard issue camouflage pattern of the Georgian Armed Forces, replaced in 2007.
: Used by Kampfschwimmer.
: Used by Underwater Demolition Command.

: Known to be used by the Haitian National Police.

 – Used by the Hong Kong Police tactical unit (SDU)
: Formerly used by reformed post-2003 Iraqi military.
: Used by Israeli military in unofficial capacity.

 
 – Worn by the Kosovar security forces.
: Asian-made Woodland patterns used in the Kyrgyz military.
 – Used by the Kuwait National Guard.
 – Worn by the Latvian Land Forces from 1992 to 2007 when the M07 LATPAT camo was issued.
 - Replaced in 2017 by the Operational Camouflage Pattern

: Clones used by PASKAL commandos.

 – Worn by Army of the Republic of Moldova.
: Used by the Montenegrin Special Anti-Terrorist Unit.
: Worn by the Royal Netherlands Marine Corps, most of the Woodland camos being replaced by Dutch-made fractal camo.
: Used by the Nigerian military until they were replaced by the M14 pattern.
: Reported to be used by North Korean soldiers stationed in the DMZ from 2010.
 Used by some units in the past, used only for trainings today.

: Russia uses near-copies (Komplekt kamuflirovannogo obmundirovannogo [KKO]) and copies (Лес or Les [forest]) worn by MVD Agencies such as the Internal Troops and Spetsnaz GRU units.
 – Used by the Royal Saudi Air Force.
: Used by Saint Kitts and Nevis Defence Force

 : Republic of Korea Armed Forces introduced 1990 used to 2011

: Copies made for the Syrian military.

: Former standard issue camouflage uniform pattern for all branches of the U.S. Armed Forces. At the state-level, several state defense forces use it.
: Blue Woodland camos used by MVS units. State Border Guard personnel use green woodland clones.
 – Worn by Army and Air Force

See also 
United States Army Engineer Research and Development Laboratory

References

Bibliography
 
 

1981 clothing
United States military uniforms
Camouflage patterns
Military camouflage
Military equipment of the United States
United States Army uniforms
Military equipment introduced in the 1980s